Tatarsky District is an administrative and municipal district (raion), one of the thirty in Novosibirsk Oblast, Russia. It is located in the west of the oblast. Its administrative center is the town of Tatarsk (which is not administratively a part of the district). Population: 15,875 (2010 Census);

Administrative and municipal status
Within the framework of administrative divisions, Tatarsky District is one of the thirty in the oblast. The town of Tatarsk serves as its administrative center, despite being incorporated separately as an administrative unit with the status equal to that of the districts.

As a municipal division, the district is incorporated as Tatarsky Municipal District, with the Town of Tatarsk being incorporated within it as Tatarsk Urban Settlement.

References

Notes

Sources



Districts of Novosibirsk Oblast